Suturocythara is a genus of sea snails, marine gastropod mollusks in the family Mangeliidae.

Species
Species within the genus Suturocythara include:
 Suturocythara redferni García, 2008
Species brought into synonymy
 Suturocythara apocrypha Garcia, 2008: synonym of Agathotoma apocrypha (Garcia, 2008) (original combination)

References

 García E.F. 2008. Eight new molluscan species (Gastropoda: Turridae) from the western Atlantic, with description of two new genera. Novapex 9(1): 1-15

External links
 Bouchet, P.; Kantor, Y. I.; Sysoev, A.; Puillandre, N. (2011). A new operational classification of the Conoidea. Journal of Molluscan Studies. 77, 273-308
 Worldwide Mollusk Data base : Mangeliidae

 
Gastropod genera